Lou is a 2022 American action thriller film directed by Anna Foerster. The film stars Allison Janney, Jurnee Smollett, Logan Marshall-Green, Ridley Asha Bateman, and Matt Craven. 

Lou was released on September 23, 2022, by Netflix, garnering mixed to positive reviews, praising Janney and criticizing the writing.

Plot 
In 1986, on Orcas Island in Washington, Lou, a loner living with her dog Jax, goes to the village to buy some supplies. She talks to the sheriff about her arthritis and he tells her a copper bracelet could help her condition. A mother, Hannah, plays hide-and-seek with her young daughter, Vee, outside their home. Lou, her landlady, stops by on her way back home to say the rent is due the next day.

Expecting a large storm, Chris, Hannah's male friend, offers to bring supplies. On his way home, he picks up a hitchhiker who kills him in his van. The hitchhiker cuts power to Hannah's home and while she is outside trying to restore power, he kidnaps Vee and flees with her on foot. Hannah runs to Lou's house, interrupting her suicide attempt, and tells her that Vee is missing. Before they are able to leave, Lou's truck blows up due to a bomb set by the hitchhiker. Eventually, Hannah and Lou set off tracking him and Vee into the night during the storm.

Hannah informs Lou that the hitchhiker is Vee's father, Philip, a former Green Beret and war criminal she thought was dead. Lou finds and kills Philip's friends on the way, clearly showing she is more than she appears to be. She explains to Hannah she is an ex-CIA field agent of 26 years. Lou and Hannah track Philip and Vee to the beach at Eagle Bay. Lou sends Hannah to radio for help, while she goes to confront Philip and rescue Vee. After a standoff, it is revealed Philip is actually Lou's son, who tracked them down after she turned him in and hid them for protection. It is also revealed that Lou abandoned him as a child to avoid blowing her undercover mission in Iran. Philip injures Lou and leaves with Vee, intending to kill all of them together.

Hannah contacts the sheriff, but a call from the United States Marshals Service forces him to stand down, as it is now a federal case. The sheriff goes to Eagle Bay nonetheless, where he finds Lou and gives her a copper bracelet. Meanwhile, Hannah arrives at the lighthouse and manages to get Vee away from Philip. After a scuffle, Hannah injures Philip and flees with Vee. Lou finds the lighthouse filled with explosives and sets them off from a distance, destroying it to signal an approaching CIA helicopter. Lou and Philip fight on the beach, until she gains the upper hand and hugs him. She apologizes as a CIA agent fires on them, and both Lou and Philip go under the water's surface.

Later, Hannah and Vee are shown in Lou's house, packed up and ready to leave. After a few questions from CIA agents and a goodbye from the sheriff, they are seen on board a ferry with Jax, who looks at someone on the upper deck, not fully in frame. The camera shifts to show a woman's arm with a similar scar that Lou had and a copper bracelet, as she watches her granddaughter and daughter-in-law through binoculars.

Cast 
 Allison Janney as Lou Adell
 Jurnee Smollett as Hannah Dawson
 Logan Marshall-Green as Philip
 Ridley Asha Bateman as Vee Dawson
 Matt Craven as Sheriff Rankin

Production

Filming 
Production was set to begin from May to July 2020 in Vancouver, Canada when originally set up at Paramount, until Bad Robot decided to produce the film independently and land with Netflix. The film officially entered production in June 2021 and wrapping in August that same year.

Casting 
Allison Janney was cast in 2019. On April 28, 2021, Jurnee Smollett signed on as one of the leading roles alongside Janney. They are both set to serve as executive producers.

Release 
The film was released on Netflix on September 23, 2022.

Reception 
 On Metacritic, the film has a weighted average score of 51 out of 100 based on 12 critics, indicating "mixed or average reviews". Jeannette Catsoulis reviewed the film for The New York Times, saying, "Unfazed either by the working conditions or by Maggie Cohn and Jack Stanley’s ridiculously over-the-top screenplay, [Janney] lends her grouchy character more than a ramrod spine and steely stare." In another positive review for The Los Angeles Times, Noel Murray writes, "The mystery of who Lou is and why she takes an interest in Hannah isn’t as surprising as the movie makes it out to be; but Janney is so commanding as an unlikely action hero that the picture still works." John Anderson of the Wall Street Journal said, "Sometimes you just want a crazy action movie to kill an evening, and “Lou” fits that bill. Just don’t expect to be thinking about it tomorrow." In a negative review, Brian Tallerico of RogerEbert.com writes, "Allison Janney proves with Lou that she could carry an action movie. If only she got one worth carrying."

References

External links 
 
 

2020s action thriller films
American action thriller films
2022 films
English-language Netflix original films
2020s American films
Films about the Central Intelligence Agency
Films about kidnapping
Films set in 1986
Films set in Washington (state)
American chase films
Bad Robot Productions films